"You Gotta Stop" is a song written by Bernie Baum, Bill Giant and Florence Kaye and originally recorded by Elvis Presley for the 1967 Paramount picture Easy Come, Easy Go. It was also featured on the soundtrack EP for the movie.

In the UK, the song was released as a single with "The Love Machine" from the same movie on the opposite side. Listed as a double A-side, the single peaked at number 38 for two weeks in that country.

Composition 
The song was written by Bernie Baum, Bill Giant and Florence Kaye.

Recording 
Elvis Presley recorded the song for the film Easy Come, Easy Go on September 29, 1966, at Paramount Studio Recording Stage in Hollywood. The recording sessions featured Scotty Moore and Tiny Timbrell on guitar, Charlie McCoy on harmonica, organ and guitar, Bob Moore on bass, D.J. Fontana, Buddy Harman, Hal Blaine, Curry Tjader and Larry Bunker on drums, Emil Radocchia on percussion, Michel Rubini on harpsichord, Mike Henderson and Anthony Terran on trumpet, Butch Parker on trombone, Jerry Scheff, Meredith Flory and Willam Hood on saxophone. Additional vocals were provided by The Jordanaires.

Critical response 
While discussing the Easy Come, Easy Go musical numbers in his books, Robert Matthew-Walker said:

Track listing

Charts

References

External links 
 

1967 songs
1967 singles
Elvis Presley songs
RCA Records singles
Songs written by Bernie Baum
Songs written by Bill Giant
Songs written by Florence Kaye